In algebraic geometry, the scheme-theoretic intersection of closed subschemes X, Y of a scheme W is , the fiber product of the closed immersions .

Here, we used  (for this identity, see tensor product of modules#Examples.)

Example: Let  be a projective variety with the homogeneous coordinate ring S/I, where S is a polynomial ring. If  is a hypersurface defined by some homogeneous polynomial f in S, then

 

If f is linear (deg = 1), it is called a hyperplane section. See also: Bertini's theorem.

Now, a scheme-theoretic intersection may not be a correct intersection, say, from the point of view of intersection theory. Since X is the union of two planes, each intersecting with Y at the origin with multiplicity one, by the linearity of intersection multiplicity, we expect X and Y intersect at the origin with multiplicity two. On the other hand, one sees the scheme-theoretic intersection  consists of the origin with multiplicity three. That is, a scheme-theoretic multiplicity of an intersection may differ from an intersection-theoretic multiplicity, the latter given by Serre's Tor formula. Solving this disparity is one of the starting points for derived algebraic geometry, which aims to introduce the notion of derived intersection.

Proper intersection 
Let X be a regular scheme and V, W closed integral subschemes.

is an equality. The intersection  is proper if every irreducible component of it is proper (in particular, the empty intersection is considered proper.) Two algebraic cycles are said to intersect properly if the varieties in the cycles intersect properly.

For example, two divisors (codimension-one cycles) on a smooth variety intersect properly if and only if they share no common irreducible component. Chow's moving lemma (on a smooth variety) says that an intersection can be made proper after replacing a divisor by a suitable linearly equivalent divisor (cf. Kleiman's theorem.)

Serre's inequality above may fail in general for a non-regular ambient scheme. For example, let . Then  have codimension one, while  has codimension three.

Some authors such as Bloch define a proper intersection without assuming X is regular: in the notations as above, a component P is proper if

See also 
complete intersection
Gysin homomorphism

References 

  

Algebraic geometry